Freaky Summer Party Festival is an annual two-day music festival with street food, art installations and entertainment spots. The following platforms are represented at the festival: Edutainment, Kidsters, Jam Market, Food Court, Blogeria. Citizens of nearby countries and Europe visit the festival. More than 240 musicians from 20 countries have performed on the festival stage.

History 
First FSP Festival was created as a local party for friends in 2008. From 2009 to 2012 FSP was held in the Rakovsky district close to the Islach river. The festival turned from a one-day art picnic into the two days festival with an afterparty.

Headliners of the FSP Festival (2014-2016)

2014 

Debruit, Cheese People, Jon Kennedy, Super Besse, 130 po vstrechnoi starenkoi Vespa, Zagortsev, Kraut, Craft, ODIS, Sasha Davydov, Fitzzgerald, Papa Bo Selektah, HMR, Remm, Andy Roc, Stereobeaver, Weedska, KorneJ.

2015 

Tom Tukker, Markas Palubenka, Anton Maskeliade, Mustelide, CherryVata, Dj Gaamer, Groosha, Super DJ Besse, Stereobeaver, Winick, KorneJ, Stas, Kazantzev, Salut80, Morgotika, Plavsky, Davydov, Funkyjaws, Fitzgerald, East Soul Person, Pafnytii Kuzukian, Deech, Bogdanov, Push’n’Pull, Hutateli.

2016 

ON-THE-GO, Mujuice, Ana Zhdanova, Balthazar, The Soul Surfers, DJ Fitzzgerald, DJ Andrew Zagortsev, DJ Papa Bo Selektah,  Markas Palubenka, 1/2 Orchestra,  Dj 50К, DJ Alein, DJ Alex Despotin, The Violent Youth, Intelligency, Delay Sound System: Kazantsev, Shumilin, Tea, Schmoltz, Stwone,  Prokop Jnr & Klaxons Brass, Black Disco: Kraut, Plavsky, Davydov, Makushkin, Skvo’s, Unhuman Remainz, Bassota, I. F. U., DIG!, Push’n'Pull, Bonehider, Mechta: Plastik, Morgotika, Gaamer.

Organizers 
The organizer of the FSP Festival is Pocket Rocket Creative Agency in Minsk.

References
Pocket Rocket Creative Agency

FSP Festival website (rus.)

FSP Festival website (eng.)

External links
 Official website of the FSP Festival in Russian
 Official website of the FSP Festival in English

Electronic music festivals in Belarus